Helernus, also known as Alernus, was an Archaic Roman deity. He was a minor god of the underworld, and god of the beans used during the Lemuria festival during May. His sacred grove (lucus) was near the mouth of the Tiber river. Sacrifices were made to him annually on the 1st of February by the Roman Pontiffs, in which a black ox was killed. He had one daughter, named Carna, who was goddess of protecting the intestines of children from vampires.

Poultney and others compare Helernus with the similarly (apparently) chthonic deity Hule/Horse/Huřie who shows up a couple times in the Umbrian Iguvine Tablets.

References

Notes

Citations

Books

Roman gods
Deities of classical antiquity
Chthonic beings
Underworld gods